Thomas Gowland (1768–1833) was a British trader, who dedicated himself to the import and export of manufactured products in Buenos Aires. He was the patriarch of the Gowland family in the Rio de la Plata, established in the Buenos Aires neighborhood of San Nicolás at the beginning of the 19th century.

Life
He was born in London, England, the son of Thomas Gowland and Emma Elizabeth Chamberlayne, a family originally from Durham. His grandparents were Edmund Chamberlayne and Elizabeth Atkyns, members of the English aristocracy. He was one of the most distinguished merchants of Buenos Aires and Montevideo, having an active part in the main mercantile activities of the British firms of the Río de la Plata. He maintained an excellent relationship with Buenos Aires society at the time, and also with Juan Manuel de Rosas, with whom he used to meet.

Thomas Gowland had emigrated to Argentina in 1812, accompanied by his wife Sarah Phillips and sons Daniel, Thomas and John. He died on November 2, 1833, when a gun was accidentally fired. He was originally buried in the Protestant Cemetery of Victoria, and transferred to the closing of this to the Gowland family pantheon in The Recoleta Cemetery.

References

External links 
www.genealogiafamiliar.net
geneanet

1768 births
1833 deaths
Businesspeople from London
People from Buenos Aires
British emigrants to Argentina
Burials at La Recoleta Cemetery
Río de la Plata
British Argentine